Darren Joseph, known professionally as DJ Target, is a British DJ.

Career 
Joseph is a former member of Roll Deep.

Joseph began hosting part of the 1Xtra Takeover, a simulcast across BBC Radio 1 and Radio 1Xtra, in September 2013.

In 2018, Joseph wrote a book titled Grime Kids. Joseph became the talent and music lead at Radio 1Xtra in July 2018, but left the role in June 2021.

In 2021, Joseph fronted a six-episode series on BBC Three called Tonight With Target.

In 2022, it was announced that Joseph would be leaving BBC Radio 1.

Personal life 
Joseph grew up in Bow, London.

References

External links
DJ Target (BBC Radio 1Xtra)
1Xtra's Pre-Party Show with DJ Target (BBC Radio 1Xtra)

British radio presenters
BBC Radio 1 presenters
BBC Radio 1Xtra presenters